The Namibian Broadcasting Corporation (NBC) (NUK) is the public broadcaster of Namibia. It was established in 1979, under the name South West African Broadcasting Corporation (SWABC).

History
Radio was originally broadcast in English and Afrikaans via shortwave from the South African Broadcasting Corporation's facilities in South Africa. The SABC established a local FM transmitter network in November 1969, relaying Radio South Africa, Radio Suid-Afrika, and Springbok Radio, and establishing a number of services in native languages, including Radio Ovambo, broadcasting in the Kwanyama and Ndonga languages, Radio Herero and Radio Damara Nama. The introduction of Radio Kavango along the northeastern border with Angola followed in February 1976 in the Kwangali, Mbukushu and Gciriku languages.

In 1965, the pro-independence movement, the South West Africa People's Organisation (SWAPO), began broadcasting a one-hour radio programme from Tanzania on short wave known as The Namibian Hour. It later started broadcasting from Zambia. In 1974, it was renamed Voice of Namibia. By 1986, it was broadcasting from Angola, Congo, Ethiopia, Madagascar and Zimbabwe, as well as from Tanzania and Zambia.

From SABC to SWABC

In May 1979 the SABC relinquished control of broadcasting services in the territory, and a new broadcaster was established in its place. This was known as the South West African Broadcasting Corporation (SWABC), in Afrikaans as Suidwes-Afrikaanse Uitsaaikorporasie (SWAUK), came into being. However, 70 per cent of the SWABC's technical personnel were on secondment from the SABC. In addition, a number of its programmes were prepared at the SABC's studios in Johannesburg before being dispatched to Windhoek for transmission.

Under the authority of the South African-appointed Administrator General, the SWABC operated nine "ethnic" radio stations in English, Afrikaans, German, Owambo, Herero, Lozi, Tswana and Damara/Nama, with the national service broadcast only in English and Afrikaans. By March 1985, 85 per cent of the population had FM radio service over 31 transmitting stations.

The SWABC's television service was introduced in October 1981, serving 50 per cent of the population, via 11 transmitters. This comprised a mix of programming in English, Afrikaans and German, 90 per cent of which came from or via the SABC.  Programmes were shown locally a week after South Africa. The SWABC  received SABC TV programming (which it recorded, edited and rebroadcast) first by using a microwave link, and later via an Intelsat satellite link.

However, Walvis Bay, an enclave of South Africa in Namibia until 1994, received the SABC's TV1 on a low-power transmitter, which was broadcast live via Intelsat from 1986.

Transition to independence 
During the transition to independence in 1989, the SWABC was accused by the United Nations Transition Assistance Group (UNTAG) of bias in its news coverage, portraying the pro-independence SWAPO party as well as UNTAG in a negative light, while being uncritical of press releases from the Administrator General's office, the police force, and anti-SWAPO parties. It was accused of particular bias towards the Democratic Turnhalle Alliance, with disproportionate coverage given to its press conferences and rallies.

In addition, in July 1989, the Administrator General was given three times as much airtime on SWABC TV as UNTAG. However, while the SWABC had offered UNTAG five minutes of radio airtime daily and ten-minute television slot in May 1989, UNTAG was unable to produce adequate broadcasts and failed to benefit from its allotted airtime until late June.

Post-independence

Following independence in 1990, the new government made the decision to make English the sole language on NBC television, while the existing English-language national radio service was made the main channel for news, sport, public affairs and other programmes. Three months after independence, NBC television began broadcasting entirely in English, while broadcasting hours for radio services in other languages were reduced.

Under the pre-independence agreements, most SWABC staff were able to keep their jobs at the new broadcaster, but they were joined by SWAPO journalists who had previously worked for the Voice of Namibia, leading to accusations of bias and favouritism from both sides.

The NBC was also accused by opposition politicians of favouring SWAPO, with Nora Schimming-Chase, vice-president of the Congress of Democrats, calling it the "Nujoma Broadcasting Corporation", a reference to Namibia's then President, Sam Nujoma. The DTA of Namibia, formerly the Democratic Turnhalle Alliance, has also accused the NBC of giving coverage of political rallies that favour SWAPO at the expense of its rivals.

Services

Radio
The NBC operates one 24-hour radio station in English (NBC National Radio, renamed National FM in 2017) and nine so-called Language Services that broadcast between 10 and 15 hours per day in Oshiwambo (Ovambo and Kwanyama; established 1969), Damara/Nama (1969), Otjiherero (1969), Rukavango (1975), Afrikaans (1979 Afrikaanse Radio Diens, renamed Hartklop FM in 2017), German (1979 Deutsches Hörfunkprogramm, renamed Funkhaus Namibia in 2017), Setswana (1981/98), Silozi (1986) and San (ǃHa Radio, 2003).

The majority of radio stations are broadcast from radio studios in Pettenkofer Street, Windhoek, but many Oshiwambo programmes emanate from the studios in Oshakati, the Rukavango service is broadcast from the studios in Rundu, the SiLozi service from Katima Mulilo and ǃHa Radio from Tsumkwe, although these are now available nationwide via digital terrestrial television.

Television
NBC continued the television service of the SWABC introduced in 1981. Since the launch of digital terrestrial television in 2013 there are three television channels (NBC 1, 2 and 3, respectively), primarily in English, but with some programming in Afrikaans, German and indigenous languages (Monday–Thursday, 17:00–17:30 on NBC 1). A number of Deutsche Welle programmes also are relayed by NBC on radio and television.

NBC 1 is also available on the DStv satellite television platform. NBC 2 and 3, however, can only be accessed by the aerial television network through proprietary decoders currently being sold throughout Namibia. There was some discussion regarding the cost of these digital decoders.

It had a monopoly on free-to-air television in Namibia until 2008, when the competitor One Africa Television, a new privately owned television station was launched.

NBC1 
A free to air channel that broadcast current affairs, children's programs, telenovelas, dramas and news. 

Original shows that aired on NBC1 include:
 Whata Lifestyle
 Tutaleni
 Tupopyeni
 Prime News
 Justeenz
 Sunshine Club
 Business Today
 Legends of Change
 On The Street
 Whatagwan
 Soccer Pitch
 Indigenous News

NBC2 
A free to air channel that broadcast news channels and Eye on SADC.

NBC3 
A pay television that airs dramas, telenovelas, sports and movies.

References

External links
Namibian Broadcasting Corporation Official website
History of the South West African Broadcasting Corporation (SWABC) 
"Letters From Robin Tyson", from the former SWABC/NBC manager Robin Tyson
Clip of SWABC news in Afrikaans, 1987

1979 establishments in South West Africa
Mass media in Namibia
Publicly funded broadcasters
Radio stations established in 1969
Radio stations in Namibia
State media
Television channels and stations established in 1981
Television channels in Namibia
Afrikaans-language radio stations
Ovambo-language mass media
Tswana-language mass media